Hypoxidia is a flowering plant genus in the family Hypoxidaceae, endemic to the Seychelles Islands in the Indian Ocean. Two species are recognized:

Hypoxidia maheensis F. Friedmann 
Hypoxidia rhizophylla (Baker) F. Friedmann

References

Endemic flora of Seychelles
Asparagales genera